Pisba (sometimes spelled Pisva) is a town and municipality in Boyacá Department, Colombia, part of the subregion of La Libertad Province. The municipality borders Paya in the east, Labranzagrande in the south and Mongua in the northwest. The Casanare municipality Támara borders Pisba in the north.

History 
Pisba is located in the east of Boyacá and in this area the Muisca inhabiting the Altiplano Cundiboyacense bordered the homelands of the U'wa in the north and the Achagua in the east. The name is derived from the Chibcha language and means "Honourable domain from before". At the arrival of the Spanish, it is said the Muisca worked hard in agriculture, mainly maize, yuca, bananas and predominantly cotton. Pisba was ruled by the iraca of Sugamuxi.

Modern Pisba was founded on April 3rd, 1629.

Nature 
The national park Páramo de Pisba is located close to Pisba and named after it.

Economy 
Main economical activities in Pisba are agriculture, silviculture and livestock farming.

Gallery

References 

Municipalities of Boyacá Department
Populated places established in 1629
1629 establishments in the Spanish Empire
Muisca Confederation
Muysccubun